The  (German) or  (Danish) is a transport corridor between Copenhagen, Denmark, and Hamburg, Germany.

As the Danish and German names (literally: bird flight line) imply, the corridor is also an important bird migration route between arctic Scandinavia and Central Europe.

History
Proposals for a more direct "bird flight line" date back from the 1920s. Construction was started on the Danish side in 1941 after the Nazi occupation force pushed the matter, but work was halted again in 1946.  After World War II, Warnemünde (near Rostock) was included in the territory of East Germany.  Political divisions made traffic between Denmark and West Germany via  Warnemünde inconvenient.

From 1951 to 1963 a ferry line from Gedser to Großenbrode operated as a temporary solution.  In addition, traffic between Copenhagen and Hamburg would either be directed over the Great Belt ferry, Funen and Jutland or the Gedser-Warnemünde ferry. Construction of the "bird flight line" was restarted in 1949 and completed in 1963.

On 14 December 2019 at 20:02 the last train from DSB and Deutsche Bahn arrived in Rødbyhavn. Trains between Hamburg and Copenhagen will run via Funen and Jutland until the Fehmarnbelt connection is completed. The rail ferry was discontinued because service would have been degraded massively while works on Sydbanen are ongoing.

Ferry link
The core of the connection is the  ferry link between Rødby (Denmark) and Puttgarden (Germany). The line is operated by Scandlines. Ferries take 45 minutes and operate twice an hour, 24 hours a day.

The projected Fehmarn Belt Fixed Link, an undersea tunnel, will replace the ferries. Danish-German negotiations on 29 June 2007 culminated in an agreement to complete the link by 2028, essentially on the basis of Danish funding.

Landside connections

Road 
The road connection consists of:
European route E47 on the Danish side.
Autobahn A1 (European routes E 47 and E22) on the German side, and the two-lane Bundesstraße 207/E 47 on the northernmost section. An additional  of motorway was completed by 2008, still leaving the last  a two-lane road.

Railway 
The rail connection consists of:
 of single track from Vordingborg to Rødby; maximum speed 
 of single track from Puttgarden to Lübeck
 of double track from Lübeck to Hamburg, electrified.

Until 2019, three to five EuroCity trains a day in each direction used train ferries to provide passenger services between Copenhagen and Hamburg, operated with DBAG Class 605 trains by Deutsche Bahn (out of service since 2017) and Danish IC3 trains.  With the completion of the Great Belt Bridge freight trains are no longer directed via Rødby-Puttgarden, but via Funen and Jutland. Since the end of 2019, passenger trains have also used this route, which is  longer but around 20 minutes faster and allows longer trains. Only some of the IC3 trains were capable of going to Germany.

These current bridges and tunnels are part of the connection:
Masnedsund Bridge and Storstrøm Bridge, Sealand/Falster (rail)
Farø Bridges, Sealand/Falster (motorway E47)
Frederick IX Bridge, Falster/Lolland (two-lane road and rail)
Guldborgsund Tunnel, Falster/Lolland (motorway E47)
 Rødbyhavn (harbour, Denmark)
 Puttgarden (harbour, Germany)
Fehmarn Sound bridge, Fehmarn/Germany (two-lane road E47 and rail)

High-speed railway under construction 

The 'Railway axis Fehmarn Belt' is the Priority Project 20 of the Trans-European Transport Network (TEN-T) that seeks to establish a high-speed rail line Copenhagen–Hamburg, and which central section is the Fehmarn Belt Tunnel's railway. In the north, it connects to the Øresund Bridge/Drogden Tunnel (Priority Project 11) and the Nordic Triangle railway/road axis (Priority Project 12), and in the south to Bremen and Hanover. The full line currently under construction consists of several new railways to be built and old railways to be upgraded, to achieve at least a maximum speed of 200 km/h on all sections:
 Copenhagen–Ringsted Line, opened on 31 May 2019, currently operating at 180 km/h, upgrading to 250 km/h in 2023.
 Sydbanen (Ringsted–Rødbyhavn), new tracks to be laid by 2021, to be electrified to reach 200 km/h by 2024.
 Fehmarn Belt Tunnel (Rødbyhavn–Puttgarden), 200 km/h, to be completed in 2028. (since revised)
 Puttgarden–Lübeck railway, to be electrified and upgraded to reach 200 km/h up from the current 100–160 km/h. The new Fehmarn Sound Tunnel (to be completed in 2028) is part of this section.
 Lübeck–Hamburg railway, to be upgraded to reach 200 km/h.

Beeline in pictures

See also
Scandlines
Fehmarn Belt Fixed Link
Gedser-Rostock bridge

References

External links

Scandlines

Connections across the Baltic Sea
Road transport in Germany
Transport in Denmark
Railway lines in Schleswig-Holstein
International transport
Rail transport in Germany
20th-century introductions
Train ferries
Fugleflugtslinjen
International trade
Trade routes
Denmark–Germany relations